Brachystigma is a genus of flowering plants belonging to the family Orobanchaceae.

Its native range is Arizona to New Mexico and Northern Mexico.

Species:

Brachystigma wrightii

References

Orobanchaceae
Orobanchaceae genera